These are the official results of the Women's Javelin Throw event at the 1995 World Championships in Gothenburg, Sweden. There were a total number of 31 participating athletes, with the final held on Tuesday August 8, 1995. All results were made with a rough surfaced javelin (old design).

Medalists

Schedule
All times are Central European Time (UTC+1)

Abbreviations
All results shown are in metres

Records

Qualification
 Held on Sunday 1995-08-06

Final

See also
 1996 Women's Olympic Javelin Throw

References
 Results

J
Javelin throw at the World Athletics Championships
1995 in women's athletics